Drosopigi (Greek: Δροσοπηγή meaning "cool spring") may refer to several villages in Greece:

Drosopigi, Corinthia, a village in the municipal unit Stymfalia, Corinthia
Drosopigi, Evrytania, a village in the municipal unit Prousos, Evrytania
Drosopigi, Florina, a village in the municipal unit Perasma, Florina regional unit
Drosopigi, Ioannina, a village in the municipal unit Mastorochoria, Ioannina regional unit
Drosopigi, Laconia, a village in the municipal unit Gytheio, Laconia
Drosopigi, Trikala, a village in the municipal unit Pialeia, Trikala regional unit